Valeriana is a genus of flowering plants in the family Caprifoliaceae, members of which may by commonly known as valerians. It contains many species, including the garden valerian, Valeriana officinalis. Species are native to all continents except Antarctica, with centers of diversity in Eurasia and South America (especially in the Andes).

Fossil record
Fossil seeds of Valeriana sp, among them †Valeriana pliocenica, have been recovered from Late Miocene deposits of southern Ukraine, from Pliocene deposits of south-eastern Belarus and Bashkortostan in central Russia. The fossil seeds are most similar to the extant European Valeriana simplicifolia.

Species

, Plants of the World Online accepts over 420 species and hybrids, including:

Valeriana alypifolia
Valeriana aretioides
Valeriana asterothrix
Valeriana bertiscea
Valeriana buxifolia
Valeriana californica
Valeriana celtica (Alpine valerian or valerian spikenard)
Valeriana cernua
Valeriana coleophylla
Valeriana dioica (marsh valerian)
Valeriana edulis
Valeriana fauriei (Korean valerian)
Valeriana montana
Valeriana occidentalis
Valeriana officinalis (garden valerian)
Valeriana pauciflora
Valeriana pyrenaica (Pyrenean valerian)
Valeriana secunda
Valeriana sitchensis (Sitka valerian)
Valeriana uliginosa

Gallery

References

External links

USDA records of the distribution of the genus in the United States

 
Caprifoliaceae genera
Taxa named by Carl Linnaeus